Gedern is a town in the Wetteraukreis district in Hesse, Germany, and historically belongs to Oberhessen.

Neighboring towns
Gedern is bordered by Schotten (Vogelsbergkreis) in the north, by Grebenhain (Vogelsbergkreis) in the northeast, by Birstein (Main-Kinzig-Kreis) in the east, by Kefenrod in the south, by Ortenberg in the southwest, and Hirzenhain in the west.

Organization
Gedern is divided into the districts of Gedern, Mittel-Seemen, Nieder-Seemen, Ober-Seemen, Steinberg, and Wenings.

History
The first records of Gedern come from the year 730 AD.
City rights were given to Gedern on January 10, 1356, by Charles IV, Holy Roman Emperor, 20 years after Wenings, a current district of Gedern, received its city rights from Louis IV, Holy Roman Emperor.
After the Congress of Vienna, command of Gedern passed to the Grand Duchy of Hesse.
Many zoning reforms have taken place in Gedern since then. In 1852 Gedern was placed into the Kreis Nidda district. Then, when this district was removed in 1874, Gedern was placed into the Schotten district. There was yet another reform in 1936, and Gedern was placed into Landkreis Büdingen. After the last reorganization in 1972, Gedern, along with five other towns, was incorporated into Wetteraukreis.

Politics

Town council

The town council consists of the mayor, Stefan Betz (independent), and the aldermen Klaus Hein, Walter Lutz and Barbara Gundlach (CDU), Klaus Bechthold and Andreas Steder (SPD), Reinhold Landmann and Irmtraud Köhler (FWG) and Willi Herbst (Bürgerliste Gedern).

Mayor
The last election for mayor was held in 2021 in which Guido Kempel was re-elected. In 2015 Kempel replaced Klaus Bechthold (SPD) who retired for health reasons.

Coat of arms
The city coat of arms shows two trout on a red and silver striped background. These represent the copious amounts of fish that were caught in and around Gedern throughout its history. The silver stripes stand for the two creeks that run through Gedern "Mühlbach" and "Gänsbach".

Partnerships
Gedern is twinned with Columbia, Illinois, and Polanów, Poland, through the Sister Cities Program. The village of Wenings is also partnered with Nucourt, France.
The sister city arrangement with Columbia roots in an initiative of some inhabitants of Columbia in 1990. During a genealogical research, they figured out that most of the 156 people who emigrated from Gedern in the 19th century, found a new home in the area of Columbia.
In April 1992 the representatives of both cities signed a treaty of friendship during a visit of a Columbian delegation in Gedern. The official partnership ceremony was held in May 1993 in Columbia, Illinois.

Economy and infrastructure

Local companies
Measured by its size, Gedern was an important industrial hub during the 1980s in the industrially weak area around the Vogelsberg. There were several textile, wood, rubber, and metal refining factories. Today only a large metal-refining company is still active.

Today Gedern is economically unimportant. Retail, manual labor, and trade work that make up the core of the economic activities are done on a very small scale. The vast majority of the inhabitants of Gedern commute to other areas in the Rhein-Main and Gießen regions.

Educational facilities
 Gedern has a comprehensive school (Gesamtschule) with the levels Hauptschule, Realschule, and Gymnasium up to tenth grade.
 Several elementary schools are also found in Gedern and the surrounding area.

Recreation
 The Gederner See (Lake Gedern) attracts many campers and swimmers every summer.
 Gedern also has a heated indoor pool in the recreation center (Sportzentrum) on Schmitterberg—the hill that separates the village from the lake area.
 Around the lake, there is also a glider runway. On weekends with nice weather one can see the gliders in the sky all around Gedern.
 The Volcano Bike Path runs from Stockheim to Lauterbach along the old train tracks.
 Ober-Seemen is also home to the county youth summer camp Groß-Gerau.

Sons and daughters of the city 

 Christian Ernest of Stolberg-Wernigerode (1691-1771), reigning Count of the County of Wernigerode
 Frederick Charles of Stolberg-Gedern (1693-1767), owner of the Stolbergian domination of Gedern
 Princess Louise of Stolberg-Gedern (1752-1824), Countess of Albany
 Eduard von Fransecky (1807-1890), Prussian General of the Infantry
 Otto of Stolberg-Wernigerode (1837-1896), politician and Vice Chancellor with Otto von Bismarck
 Edgar Itt (born 1967), athlete (sprinter)
 Sandra Minnert (born 1973), football player and manager

References

External links
  

Wetteraukreis
Grand Duchy of Hesse